The second season of the American reality competition television series Lego Masters premiered on Fox on June 1, 2021. The series is based on the British series of the same name. The season concluded with 12 episodes on September 14, 2021 with brothers Mark & Steven Erikson being crowned the winners. 

On December 3, 2021, it was announced that the series had been renewed for a third season.

Host and judges 
Alongside the renewal in November 2020, it was announced that Will Arnett, Jamie Berard and Amy Corbett would return from the previous season.

Elimination table 

†Team awarded the Golden Brick.

Notes

Episodes

Ratings

References 

2021 American television seasons